Anthony Clive Sullivan (born 23 November 1968) is a Welsh former professional dual-code international rugby league and rugby union footballer who played in the 1980s, 1990s and 2000s. He is the son of Wales (RL) international Clive Sullivan.

Early life
Sullivan was born in Hull, East Riding of Yorkshire, England.

Playing career
Sullivan was selected to represent Wales (RL) at the 1995 Rugby League World Cup. He played for St Helens on the wing in their 1996 Challenge Cup Final victory over Bradford Bulls. At the end of Super League's first season, he was named on the wing in the 1996 Super League Dream Team. Together with Alan Hunte he was the 1997 St. Helens' top try scorer. In the 1997 post season, Sullivan was selected to play for Great Britain on the wing in the first match of the Super League Test series against Australia. His usual position was on the wing and he was named in this position in 1998's Super League III Super League Dream Team. Sullivan played for St. Helens on the wing in their 1999 Super League Grand Final victory over Bradford Bulls. He also played for St Helens on the wing in their 2000 Super League Grand Final victory over Wigan. He played for Wales in the 2000 Rugby League World Cup. As Super League V champions, St. Helens played against 2000 NRL Premiers, Brisbane Broncos in the 2001 World Club Challenge. Sullivan played on the wing in Saints' victory. He became a dual-code international when he represented the Wales national rugby union team in 2001.

County Cup Final appearances
Anthony Sullivan played  in St. Helens' 24–14 victory over Rochdale Hornets in the 1991–92 Lancashire Cup Final during the 1991–92 season at Wilderspool Stadium, Warrington, on Sunday 20 October 1991, and played  in the 4–5 defeat by Wigan in the 1992–93 Lancashire Cup Final during the 1992–93 season at Knowsley Road, St. Helens, on Sunday 18 October 1992.

Regal Trophy Final appearances
Anthony Sullivan played  in St. Helens' 16–25 defeat by Wigan in the 1995–96 Regal Trophy Final during the 1995–96 at Alfred McAlpine Stadium, Huddersfield on Saturday 13 January 1996.

References

External links
Profile at saints.org.uk
(archived by web.archive.org) Wales 2000 RLWC squad

1968 births
Living people
Black British sportspeople
Cardiff RFC players
Dual-code rugby internationals
English people of Welsh descent
English rugby league players
English rugby union players
Great Britain national rugby league team players
Hull Kingston Rovers players
Rugby league players from Kingston upon Hull
Rugby league wingers
Rugby union players from Kingston upon Hull
Rugby union wings
St Helens R.F.C. players
Wales international rugby union players
Wales national rugby league team players